Naducauvery is a village in Thiruvaiyaru Taluk, Thanjavur district, Tamil Nadu, India. Previously, Naducauvery was known as Uthanda Vijayaragapuram. It is located at a distance of 17 Km from Thanjavur on the way to Thirukkattupalli.

Population 

The Naducauvery village has population of 12240of which 2616 are males while 2624 are females as per Population Census 2011. Average Sex Ratio of Naducauvery village is 1003 which is higher than Tamil Nadu state average of 996.

Literacy

Nadukcauvery village has higher literacy rate compared to Tamil Nadu. In 2011, literacy rate of Nadukcauvery village was 88.55 % compared to 80.09 % of Tamil Nadu. In Nadukcauvery, Male literacy stands at 92.57 % while female literacy rate was 84.54 %.

Famous Places Nearby

Kallanai Dam
Brihadisvara Temple, Thanjavur
Thanjavur Maratha Palace

References

 

Villages in Thanjavur district